Dakota Territory Resource Corp, a Reno, Nevada corporation, is a publicly traded gold development company owning land in the historic Homestake District of the northern Black Hills of South Dakota, an area that once produced the second largest amount of gold in U.S. history. Otherwise known as the Homestake Mine or the Homestake Deposit, the 100-square-mile area yielded approximately 44 million ounces of gold in its 136-year-history, placing it second in U.S. gold production only to the Carlin District of northeast Nevada, and ranking it the largest iron-formation-hosted gold deposit in the world.

During the 1980s and 1990s, Richard Bachman, geologist and now president and director of Dakota Territory Resource Corp, managed a team for Homestake Mining Company that was successful in uncovering and expanding new significant gold mineralization areas. While the mining at the Homestake Mine halted in 2002 due to low gold prices and high mining expenses, from 2011-2014, Dakota Territory Resource Corp acquired crucial sample data as well as mineral acres, broadening its property position in the Homestake District in efforts to restart a gold revitalization there similar to what was done two to three decades earlier. In a venture to continue exploration and development of this precious metals site, today Dakota Territory Resource Corp attempts to breathe new life into this once-profitable gold mining area. They cite a commitment to exploration of gold with sustainable practices.

The total mineral area Dakota Territory Resource Corp owns covers 3,057 acres, including: the Blind Gold, City Creek, and Homestake Paleoplacer Properties.  Dakota Territory Resource Corp trades under the symbol DTRC:OTCQB.

History 

During the Gold Rush of the late 19th century, brothers Fred and Moses Manuel and their partners, Alex Engh and Hank Harney, staked out an area in the northern Black Hills of what was then considered Dakota Territory (today Lead, South Dakota). On April 9, 1876, they discovered there an outcropping of a vein of ore, and quickly claimed the property theirs, naming it the "Homestake". Soon other miners followed suit, seeing great gold potential, and a town was built around the Homestake. A year later, three entrepreneurs, George Hearst (father of the famous newspaper tycoon William Randolph Hearst), Lloyd Tevis, and James Ben Ali Haggin, bought the Homestake from them for $70,000, and founded the Homestake Mining Company. Because of the remote location, mining equipment had to be brought in from Nebraska, but eventually a mill began crushing ore in July 1878. A year later, the three partners sold shares in the Homestake Mining Company, listing it on the New York Stock Exchange (NYSE), which would become one of the longest-listed stocks in the history of the NYSE (NYSE:HM).

Management Team 

Richard Bachman, president and director, previously worked for 22 years at Homestake Mining Company in various capacities including regional geologist, managing an exploration program focused on the discovery of a repeat of the Homestake Mine. Gerald Aberle, vice president, COO, and director, also worked for 22 years with Homestake Mining Company, at the Homestake gold mine in Lead, South Dakota.  He also consulted for 14 years with Homestake Mining Co. as well as Barrick Gold Corp. Wm Chris Mathers is CFO, and Anthony Kamin is director.

References 

Gold mining companies of the United States